Ammann Group Holding AG is a Swiss mechanical engineering company specialised on machines for the building industry and road construction. The group of companies employs around 3000 people and generated sales of CHF 900 million in 2020.

As of 2012, the company employs a workforce of about 3,400. It is incorporated in Bern, but its offices are located in Langenthal (canton of Bern).

The company is a family business founded in  1869 by Jakob Ammann. Ammann developed an internal-combustion powered Road roller in 1911. From  1931, the company also acted as representative of Caterpillar Inc. in Switzerland. In the 1980s, Ammann Group expanded to Germany and France (joint-venture with Yanmar 1989), and currently has production facilities in eight locations, Langenthal in Switzerland,  Alfeld (Leine) and Hennef in Germany, Verona in Italy, Nové Město nad Metují in the Czech Republic, Shanghai in China, Gravatai in Brazil and Ahmedabad in India.

From 1990 until his election to the Swiss Federal Council in 2010, the company chairman was Johann Schneider-Ammann.

Since the appointment as CEO of Hans-Christian Schneider, the son of Johann Schneider-Ammann, the company has been administered in the owner family's sixth generation.

References

Construction equipment manufacturers of Switzerland
Companies based in Bern
Swiss companies established in 1869
Swiss brands
Langenthal
Manufacturing companies established in 1869